VNUHCM-University of Economics and Law (VNUHCM-UEL) is a university in Linh Xuan ward, Thu Duc, Ho Chi Minh City, Vietnam. It is a member institution of university of Vietnam National University, Ho Chi Minh City (VNU-HCM). It was previously known as VNU-HCM Faculty of Economics (established in 2000) and was upgraded to university on March 24, 2010. To be able to meet the demands of socio-economic development in Vietnam as the industrialization, modernization, and global integration of Vietnam are on the rise, the University of Economics and Law has become a leading higher education institution and a center for scientific research and technology transfer of high quality in the fields of economics, law, and management.

As one of the renowned and well-known universities in Vietnam, the University of Economics and Law has a broad range of courses in business and law, including courses in finance, management, technology and marketing; international law, trade law, and securities law, among many other courses. There is a challenging and tough competitive admissions test for the university every year, and it is one of the most competitive in Vietnam. In terms of their knowledge of foreign languages, it is widely recognized that students from UEL are active, well-qualified, and comprehensive when it comes to their knowledge of foreign languages.

In addition to undergraduate programs, the university also offers a wide range of graduate programs. There are several main subjects and majors offered by the university, including:
 The following fields are included in the scope of Economics: Economics, International Economic Relations, Economics and Public Management, Finance and Banking, Accounting, Management Information Systems, Business Administration, International Business, Auditing, Marketing, and Electronic Commerce.
 The following fields are included in the scope of Field of Law: Business Law, International Trade Law, Civil Law and Finance - Banking - Securities Law

Faculties and Departments
In total, UEL has nine faculties and one department, which can be found in the following order:
 Faculty of Economics
 Faculty of International Economic Relations
 Faculty of Finance and Banking
 Faculty of Accounting and Auditing
 Faculty of Information Systems
 Faculty of Business Administration
 Faculty of Law
 Faculty of Economic Law
 Faculty of Economics Mathematics
 Department of Foreign Language

As a subsidiary of Vietnam National University HCM, the university is a member of AUN, one of the largest education association in ASEAN, which consists of wide range of universities, colleges and educational institutions.

External links
Official Website in Vietnamese

Universities in Ho Chi Minh City